David Longstaff (born 26 August 1974) is a British ice hockey forward.  He is the Head Coach of the Whitley Warriors of the National Ice Hockey League.

After starting his career with his hometown club, Whitley Bay Warriors, Longstaff moved to the Sheffield Steelers in 1995, enjoying several victories and success in a variety of league and play-off games. Longstaff has previously been awarded Young Player of the Year and Superleague Player of the Year. Longstaff then moved to Sweden in 2001, spending one season in the Elitserien with Djurgårdens IF before returning to the UK, signing with the Newcastle Vipers in 2002.  He also had brief spells with the Manchester Storm and in Switzerland with HC Sierre-Anniviers.  He returned to the Vipers in 2003 before joining the Guildford Flames prior to the 2010/11 season.
Longstaff became the first man to reach 100 caps for Great Britain on 10 November against Romania in a 3–0 win in the qualifiers for the Winter Olympics.

David has since left the Guildford Flames, and returned home to the North East in 2015, where he is now head coach for the Whitley Warriors.

David is the father of Newcastle United footballers Sean Longstaff and Matty Longstaff, and a cousin of former England international footballer Alan Thompson.

Longstaff was one of three Ice Hockey figures inducted into the British Ice Hockey Hall of Fame in 2022.

References

1974 births
Djurgårdens IF Hockey players
English ice hockey forwards
Living people
Manchester Storm (1995–2002) players
Newcastle Vipers players
Sheffield Steelers players
Guildford Flames players
Whitley Warriors players
British expatriate ice hockey people
English expatriate sportspeople in Sweden
Expatriate ice hockey players in Sweden
People from Whitley Bay
Sportspeople from Tyne and Wear
English expatriate sportspeople in Switzerland
Expatriate ice hockey players in Switzerland